Green University of Bangladesh (GUB) is a private university in Dhaka, Bangladesh. It offers BBA, MBA, Journalism & Media Communication, LLB, English, Sociology, LLM, EEE and BSc in Computer Science, Textile Engineering and IT degrees among others.

The university is accredited by the government of the People's Republic of Bangladesh, and its curricula and programs have been approved by the Bangladesh University Grants Commission, the only national accreditation authority in Bangladesh. The President of the People's Republic of Bangladesh is the Chancellor of Green University of Bangladesh. The Vice Chancellor, the Pro-Vice Chancellor, and the Treasurer are appointed by the President of the country in his capacity as the Chancellor of the university.

History
Green University of Bangladesh (GUB) was founded in 2003 under the Private University Act 1992.

Administration
The university has four faculties. Each faculty has departments. A dean is the head of each faculty, while departments are headed by chairpersons.

List of vice-chancellors 
 Prof. Md. Golam Samdani Fakir (May 2013 – present)

Departments

Faculty of Science and Engineering

Undergraduate programs 
 B.Sc. in Electrical and Electronics Engineering
 B.Sc. in Computer Science & Engineering
 B.Sc. in Textile Engineering

Faculty of Business

Undergraduate program 
 Bachelor of Business Administration (BBA)

Graduate program 

 Master of Business Administration (MBA)
 Master of Bank Management (MBM)

Arts & Humanities and Social Sciences

Undergraduate program 
 Bachelor of Arts (Honors) in English
 Bachelor of Laws (LLB-Hon's)
 Bachelor of Laws (LLB-Pass)
 Journalism & Media Communication
 BSS (Hon's) in Sociology
 BSS (Hon's) in Anthropology

Graduate program 
 Master of Laws (LL.M)

Scholarship arrangement
There are special discounts on tuition fees including scholarships for poor and meritorious students. 25% to 100% discount is available for undergraduate programs.

Academic session
 Spring: February to July 
 Fall: August to January

Journals
 Green University of Bangladesh Journal of Science and Engineering (GUBJSE)
 Green University Review of Social Sciences (GURSS)

Library facilities
In addition to studies, there are library facilities to develop the talents and thinking of the students. The library has local and foreign books.

Programming contests
A two-day(12-13 Oct 2018) inter-university programming contest was held at Green University's auditorium with the participation of 116 groups of 45 universities across the country by the initiative of Green University and US Bangla Airlines.

 US-Bangla Airlines - Green University of Bangladesh IUPC 2018

Gallery

References

External links
 Green University of Bangladesh Home page

Private universities in Bangladesh
Educational institutions established in 2002
2002 establishments in Bangladesh
Universities and colleges in Dhaka